Antoine Préget (born October 5, 1972) is a French footballer who has played defence/midfield for a number of European clubs.

Career
Préget began his career with Nîmes Olympique and spent three years with Les crocodiles before spending single seasons with LB Châteauroux and Toulouse FC. Préget then had a trial with Southampton in a bid to move to British football before joining Scottish side Raith Rovers. A move to Dundee United followed but Préget made just four appearances during his time at Tannadice. A move to Greece beckoned and despite a trial with Reading, Préget headed back to France in 2001 with AS Cannes.

References

People from Sète
1972 births
Living people
French footballers
French expatriate footballers
Nîmes Olympique players
LB Châteauroux players
Toulouse FC players
Raith Rovers F.C. players
Dundee United F.C. players
AS Cannes players
Panionios F.C. players
Expatriate footballers in Scotland
Expatriate footballers in Greece
Ligue 1 players
Scottish Football League players
Scottish Premier League players
US Marseille Endoume players
Association football midfielders
Sportspeople from Hérault
Footballers from Occitania (administrative region)